Young Mans Butte is a summit in Stark County, North Dakota, in the United States.

Young Mans Butte was named from an incident when a group of young Arikara men became separated at this butte, and were not seen again.

References

Landforms of Stark County, North Dakota
Mountains of North Dakota